Yao Yongquan (born 15 January 1987) is a Chinese retired goalball player. He won a gold medal at the 2008 Summer Paralympics. He scored the winning goal in the last seconds of the final as China beat Lithuania 9–8.

Yao lost most of his eyesight after an accident in 1998. He studied acupuncture and has worked as a medical provider in a hospital in his hometown of Dalian, Liaoning province, following his retirement.

References

Male goalball players
1987 births
Living people
Sportspeople from Dalian
People from Zhuanghe
Paralympic goalball players of China
Paralympic gold medalists for China
Goalball players at the 2008 Summer Paralympics
Goalball players at the 2012 Summer Paralympics
Medalists at the 2008 Summer Paralympics
Paralympic medalists in goalball